Bradley or Brad Jones may refer to:

Sports 
 Brad Jones (racing driver) (born 1960), Australian racing driver
 Brad Jones (ice hockey) (born 1965), American former professional ice hockey left winger
 Brad Jones (soccer) (born 1982), Australian footballer
 Brad Jones (American football) (born 1986), American football linebacker
 Brad Jones (basketball) (born c. 1969), American basketball coach
 Bradley Jones (snooker player) (born 1974), English former snooker player

Other 
 Brad Jones (bassist) (born 1963), American jazz bassist
 Brad Jones (musician), pop singer
 Bradley Jones Jr. (born 1965), minority leader of the Massachusetts House of Representatives
 Brad Jones (born 1981), American film critic, actor, filmmaker, YouTuber, comedian, and the creator and star of The Cinema Snob